Shaun Brooks (born 9 October 1962) is an English former professional footballer who played in the Football League for Crystal Palace, Leyton Orient and Bournemouth. He is the son of Johnny Brooks who was also a professional footballer for several clubs and represented England on three occasions.

Playing career
Brooks began his youth career with Crystal Palace and signed professional terms in October 1979. His senior debut came in a home 1–0 win against Leeds United on 12 April 1980, but it was his only appearance that season. Over the next three seasons, Brooks made 17, (0 goals), 25 (2) and 7 (2) appearances respectively, and in October 1983 after four further games, moved on to Leyton Orient.

In four seasons at Leyton Orient, brooks made 148 League appearances scoring 26 times before moving on to Bournemouth in 1987 for whom he played 128 times (13 goals). He was released by Bournemouth in 1992 and spent two seasons with Dorchester Town before making a brief return to Bournemouth. Brooks finished his League career with Leyton Orient, moving to Worthing in 1996.

References

External links
 

English footballers
English Football League players
Association football midfielders
1962 births
Living people
Crystal Palace F.C. players
Leyton Orient F.C. players
AFC Bournemouth players
Dorchester Town F.C. players
Worthing F.C. players